Cheshmeh Anjir (also Romanized as Cheshmeh Anjīr; also known as Anjīr) is a village in Jannatabad Rural District, Salehabad County, Razavi Khorasan Province, Iran. At the 2006 census, its population was 341, in 61 families.

References 

Populated places in   Torbat-e Jam County